The WWC Hardcore Championship was a short-lived title in the World Wrestling Council that was defended under Hardcore wrestling rules.

Title history

Combined reigns

Footnotes

References

External links
wrestling data

Hardcore wrestling championships
World Wrestling Council championships